Julita (IPA: [hu'lɪtɐ]), officially the Municipality of Julita, is a 5th class municipality in the province of Leyte, Philippines. According to the 2020 census, it has a population of 15,598 people.

Julita is 47 kilometers from Tacloban, the capital city of Eastern Visayas. It is located between the municipalities of Dulag and Burauen.

The municipality of Julita was created through Presidential Executive Order No. 278 in 1949 under President Elpidio Quirino. Making it the second town after La Paz that parted its way to become independent from its maiden town Burauen.

Agriculture is the main industry in the area, especially rice and coconut production. About 70% of the working population is engaged in agriculture. Most live below the poverty line, and many lack basic necessities of life.

Geography

Barangays
Julita is politically subdivided into 26 barangays.

Climate

Demographics

Economy

References

External links
 [ Philippine Standard Geographic Code]
Philippine Census Information
Local Governance Performance Management System

Municipalities of Leyte (province)
Establishments by Philippine executive order